Indiana's 7th congressional district is a congressional district in the U.S. state of Indiana. It is entirely located within Marion County and includes most of Indianapolis, except for the southern side, which is located within the 6th district.

The district is currently represented by Democrat André Carson, who won a special election in 2008 to succeed his grandmother Julia Carson following her death in 2007. With a Cook Partisan Voting Index rating of D+19, it is the most Democratic district in Indiana.

The district is one of three to be represented by a Muslim in the United States (the others being Michigan's 13th, represented by Rashida Tlaib, and Minnesota's 5th, represented by Ilhan Omar).

This district and its predecessors have not elected a Republican since 1972, and it is considered a safe Democratic seat.

Composition 

As of 2023, Indiana’s 7th congressional district is located entirely in Marion County, covering the capital Indianapolis, except for the southernmost townships of the county.

Marion County is split between this district and the 6th district. They are partitioned by E Troy Ave. The 7th district encompasses the cities of Indianapolis and Lawrence, and the surrounding 6 townships of Pike, Washington, Lawrence, Warren, Center, and Wayne, and part of the city of Beech Grove.

Largest Cities
Cities within the district with more than 10,000 residents.
 Indianapolis - 887,642
 Lawrence - 49,370

Election results from presidential races

Characteristics

The current area of the 7th District is largely the same as what had been the 10th District from 1983 to 2003. It includes all of Center Township, now widely regarded as a Democratic stronghold due to its large African American population and gentrified middle class.

Traditionally, the city and the district has been more competitive and much more Republican. In fact, for years Indianapolis was one of the most Republican metropolitan areas in the country, particularly during the years when Richard Lugar and William H. Hudnut III served as Mayor of Indianapolis. However, in recent decades, much of the affluence of the city has begun to migrate to the edges of the city and outer Marion County, which has resulted in the Democratic lean. The southern portion of Marion County, which tilts more Republican, is not included in the district.

The southern and eastern parts of the district include the more modest neighborhoods of the city, which is home to Amtrak's largest repair yard. Since the late 1990s, there has been an influx of Mexican and Hispanic workers to the district, which has further increased its Democratic leanings. Also, as the industrial and financial center of Indiana, the district has been strongly influenced by the politics of the unions in the past; however, their influence over the district has become increasingly marginal in recent years.

In recent presidential contests, the district itself has given comfortable margins to Bill Clinton, Al Gore, John Kerry, Barack Obama, Hillary Clinton and Joe Biden. Most recently in 2020, Joe Biden won 62.9% of the vote in the 7th Congressional District.

Redistricting
From 1967 to 2003, the district served a completely different area of Indiana, covering Fountain, Parke, Tippecanoe, Montgomery, Clinton, Boone, Hendricks, Vigo, Clay, Putnam, and Owen counties and parts of Morgan and Hamilton counties. It had a dramatically different political history from the current 7th; it was a mostly rural area anchored by Terre Haute and Lafayette, and was heavily Republican.

After the loss of a congressional seat in 2000 by virtue of that year's census, an ambitious redistricting plan was implemented in 2002. As mentioned above, most of the old 10th became the new 7th, while the territory of the old 7th was split into the 4th and 8th districts.

List of members representing the district

Recent election results

2002

2004

2006

2008

2010

2012

2014

2016

2018

2020

Historical district boundaries

See also

Indiana's congressional districts
List of United States congressional districts

Notes

References

 Congressional Biographical Directory of the United States 1774–present

07
Marion County, Indiana
Government of Indianapolis
Constituencies established in 1833
1833 establishments in Indiana